The Inauguration of the President of Kazakhstan is a ceremony that takes place to mark the start of a new term for the President of the Republic of Kazakhstan.

Oath of Office 
During the inaugural ceremony the president-elect puts his/her right hand on the Constitution of Kazakhstan to which he recites the oath of office:

After his/her assumption to officer, the Chairman of the Central Election Commission then hands the presidential certificate to the new president.

List of inaugural ceremonies

References 

Ceremonies in Kazakhstan
Presidential inaugurations